Bayanlu (also Romanized as Bayānlū, Bayanloo, Beyānlū, and Biyānlu; also known as Bīanu) is a village in Seylatan Rural District, in the Central District of Bijar County, Kurdistan Province, Iran. At the 2006 census, its population was 604, in 148 families. The village is populated by Azerbaijanis.

References 

Towns and villages in Bijar County
Azerbaijani settlements in Kurdistan Province